In cnidarian anatomy, acontias (singular acontia) are threadlike tissues, composed largely of stinging cells located in the coelenteron of certain sea anemones. They are thrown out of the mouth or special pores when irritated.

References

Cnidarian biology